Torremocha can refer to:

The name of several places in Spain:

 Torremocha, Cáceres
 Torremocha de Ayllón, a village in Soria, part of the municipality of San Esteban de Gormaz
 Torremocha del Campo, a town in the province of Guadalajara, Castile-La Mancha
 Torremocha de Jadraque, a town in the province of Guadalajara, Castile-La Mancha
 Torremocha de Jarama, a town in the province of Madrid
 Torremocha de Jiloca, a town in the province of Teruel, Aragon
 Torremocha del Pinar, a town in the province of Guadalajara, Castile-La Mancha